H. Lalbiakthanga (born 11 February 1991) is an Indian professional footballer who plays as a midfielder for Aizawl in the I-League.

Career
Lalbiakthanga, before playing for Aizawl, played for Kulikawn and Luangmual in the Mizoram Premier League. He made his professional debut for Aizawl in the I-League on 9 January 2016 against the reigning champions, Mohun Bagan. He played 75 minutes as Aizawl lost 3–1.

I-League statistics

References

External links 
 Aizawl Football Club Profile.

1991 births
Living people
Indian footballers
Luangmual F.C. players
Aizawl FC players
Association football midfielders
Footballers from Mizoram
I-League players
Mizoram Premier League players